Clara Vodă (born 8 March 1970) is a Romanian actress. She appeared in more than twenty films since 1995.

Selected filmography

References

External links
 
 

1970 births
Living people
People from Constanța
Romanian film actresses
Romanian television actresses